Luzhou Yunlong Airport  is a dual-use military and civilian airport in the city of Luzhou in China's Sichuan province. Preparatory work for the airport began in October 2013 with a total investment of 2.77 billion yuan, while construction officially started on 5 November 2016. The airport was opened on 10 September 2018 with the inaugural Colorful Guizhou Airlines flight from Guiyang, and all flights were transferred from the old Luzhou Lantian Airport.

Facilities
Luzhou Yunlong is a class 4D airport, with the ability to handle Airbus A320 and Boeing 737 aircraft. It has a  terminal building, and ten aircraft parking spots. It is projected to handle 2 million passengers annually by 2020.

Airlines and destinations

See also
List of airports in China
List of the busiest airports in China

References

Airports in Sichuan
Airports established in 2018
Luzhou
2018 establishments in China
Chinese Air Force bases